Edson Marques (born 26 January 1982), commonly known as Eka, is a Brazilian futsal player who played for ElPozo Murcia as a Pivot. In May 2020 he left Jimbee Cartagena, having scored 11 goals in 20 matches. He signed a three season contract with French team FC Kingersheim Futsal in July 2020.

Honors
1 Copa do Brasil (2005)
1 Juegos Abiertos (1999)
2 Campeonatos Estatales (1999, 2000)

References

External links
lnfs.es

1982 births
Living people
Brazilian men's futsal players
Santiago Futsal players
Inter FS players
AD Sala 10 players